Manoly José Baquerizo Córdova (born 15 December 1998) is an Ecuadorian footballer who plays as a midfielder for the Spanish Primera Federación club CP Cacereño and the Ecuador women's national team.

References

External links
Manoly Baquerizo at BDFútbol

1998 births
Living people
Sportspeople from Guayaquil
Ecuadorian women's footballers
Women's association football midfielders
Clayton State Lakers athletes
College women's soccer players in the United States
CP Cacereño players
Segunda Federación (women) players
Ecuador women's international footballers
Ecuadorian expatriate footballers
Ecuadorian expatriate sportspeople in the United States
Expatriate women's soccer players in the United States
Ecuadorian expatriate sportspeople in Spain
Expatriate women's footballers in Spain
Ecuadorian women's futsal players
21st-century Ecuadorian women
Primera Federación (women) players
CP Cacereño (women) players